Lithuania – United Kingdom relations are foreign relations between the United Kingdom and Lithuania. The UK never recognised de jure the Soviet annexation of 1940. The UK recognised the restoration of Lithuanian independence on 27 August 1991.  Both countries re-established diplomatic relations in October 1991.
The United Kingdom has an embassy in Vilnius and an honorary consulate in Klaipėda.  Lithuania has an embassy in London and five honorary consulates (in Northern Ireland, Northumberland, Scotland, Wales and the West Midlands).

Overview 

There are around 100,000 Lithuanian people living in the United Kingdom. Both countries are full members of NATO.

The current ambassador to Lithuania is Brian Olley, ambassador to the UK is Renatas Norkus.

In 2006, the queen of the United Kingdom Elizabeth II paid a visit to Lithuania.

Gallery

See also 
 Foreign relations of the United Kingdom
 Foreign relations of Lithuania
 Lithuanians in the United Kingdom

References

External links 
 British Foreign and Commonwealth Office about relations with Lithuania
   British embassy in Vilnius
  Lithuanian embassy in London

 

 
Bilateral relations of the United Kingdom
United Kingdom